Gare de Denfert-Rochereau is a railway station in Paris. It was one of the first stations of the French railway network, and is still in use as a station of Paris' RER line B.

The station was built from 1842 and opened on 7 June 1846 as the Gare d'Enfer (or Gare de Paris-d'Enfer), after the nearby Place d'Enfer (now called the Place Denfert-Rochereau), itself named after the Barrière d'Enfer. The station building had a circular shape as it possessed a rail loop. Indeed, the station was the Parisian terminus of a line from Sceaux. The line was extended to Luxembourg station in 1895, with the newly created Port-Royal station along the way. At the same time, the station was renamed after Pierre Philippe Denfert-Rochereau. The line was operated by the Chemin de Fer de Paris à Orléans until 1937 when the Compagnie du Chemin de Fer Métropolitain de Paris (CMP) (predecessor of the RATP) took over. It became line B of the RER in 1977 on being extended to meet line A at Châtelet – Les Halles.

The station building of Denfert-Rochereau station is the oldest railway building still standing in Paris.

Denfert-Rochereau remains a station of line B of the Réseau Express Régional and is an interchange with the métro station of the same name, Denfert-Rochereau.

Gallery

References 
The original content of this article comes from this version of the equivalent French-language Wikipedia article, :fr:Gare de Denfert-Rochereau.

Réseau Express Régional stations
Railway stations in Paris
Railway stations in France opened in 1846
Buildings and structures in the 14th arrondissement of Paris